Glyndon is an unincorporated community in Baltimore County, Maryland, United States. Founded in 1871 by Dr. Charles A. Leas, the village is located in the northwest section of Baltimore County and is primarily a residential suburb of metropolitan Baltimore City. The village is characterized by the predominance of historic Victorian homes and a strong sense of community among its residents. Glyndon is listed on the National Register of Historic Places (1973) and on the Maryland Inventory of Historic Properties (1973); the Glyndon Historic District was also designated as the first historic district in Baltimore County (1981).  Also listed on the National Register of Historic Places is the Worthington Valley Historic District.

History
Glyndon still maintains much of the charm it had as a Victorian summer village over 100 years ago. The arrival of the Western Maryland Rail Road in 1860 promoted the early location and growth of Glyndon. The area itself was beautiful, with green expanses and tall trees; sitting at almost 700 feet above sea level guaranteed delightful summers and mild winters.

Prior to 1871, Dr. Charles A. Leas, the first health officer of Baltimore City and a former American consul, made several purchases of land in what is now Glyndon. When he discovered that farming was not his metier, he decided to found a small town. He employed the Baltimore surveyor Augustus Bouldin to lay out the lots and streets, planting rows of maples along the avenues. Baltimore County businessman Samuel P. Townsend also promoted the growth of the town with his purchase and development of a substantial number of acres. He assumed an active role in the community as a merchant, a railroad agent, and a postmaster.

Affluent Baltimorians acquired summer homes in early Glyndon to escape the heat of the city. The proximity of the railroad to Glyndon allowed easy commuting for the businessmen to their jobs in the city some 25 miles away. Two- and three-story Victorian homes, with large airy rooms, wide halls from front to rear, and spacious porches, was the type of architecture chosen by the majority of the builders. Additionally, several boarding houses invited city folks to live in the country during the summer months.

A small business district grew up around the railroad station to service the needs of Glyndon's growing population. Besides the station, along Railroad Avenue there were a post office, a general store, a town hall, a blacksmith shop, a livery, a wheelwright shop, and an ice cream parlor. Along nearby Chatsworth Avenue (originally Reisterstown Avenue) there were a general store, a bakery, a butchery, an ice house, a carpenter, and the town magistrate's office. There was, however, no candlestick maker.

The Western Maryland Railway and a later streetcar line, the Pikesville, Reisterstown & Emory Grove Railway, also brought summer people to Emory Grove, a Methodist religious campground founded before Glyndon in 1868. Across Butler Road (what was then called Dover Road) to the south is Glyndon Park, established in 1887 as a temperance camp meeting ground, the first of its kind in the nation south of the Mason and Dixon's Line.

In 1878, the Glyndon United Methodist Church(then called the Glyndon Methodist Episcopal Church) was constructed on Dover Road. The original brown-shingled chapel was destroyed by fire in 1929 and the present stone structure was dedicated in 1931. In 1873 the cornerstone was laid for Sacred Heart Church, at the time the only Catholic church between Westminster and Baltimore. The handsome Gothic structure was built with marble from the nearby quarry at the foot of “Dark Hollow Hill” (the Hill now being part of Butler Road).

There were two schools in the immediate area. St. George's Hall, located at the end of Central Avenue where Bond Avenue crosses the railroad tracks (506 Bond), was established by Prof. J. C. Kinear in 1876 as a private boarding school for boys. The original building was destroyed by fire in 1896; it was replaced with the current structure.

The two-room Glyndon School on Butler Road was built in 1887 when the growing year-round population of Glyndon necessitated a public school. The school house was abandoned in 1930 after consolidation with Franklin Elementary School in Reisterstown. In 1932 it became the home of the Woman's Club of Glyndon. The Club was originally established in 1898 by some ladies who were “summering” in Glyndon and who gathered on a regular basis on a neighbor's porch to read together. They called themselves the Glyndon Porch Class. Today the Woman's Club of Glyndon promotes literary and social activities as well as interest in local civic problems and in national and world affairs.

The Glyndon Volunteer Fire Department has been active since 1904. Over the years its members have worked hard to provide the most modern and effective fire protection possible for the residents of the Glyndon community and of the surrounding area. The Ladies Auxiliary, organized in 1953, helps with this mission by raising funds for the work of the Company.

Geography
Glyndon is located at a latitude of 39.4764935 North and a longitude of 76.8158100 West at an elevation of 689 feet. Butler Road, formerly Dover Road, is the main road.

Demographics
According to the 2000 census, the population of Glyndon was 424 (female 210, male 214). The median age was 39.6. The average household size was 2.72 and the average family size 3.30. The population was  96.5% White, 1.2% Black, 0.5% Asian, 1.9% of two or more races and 0.2% Hispanic/Latino. Of the population aged 25 and over, 96.1% had achieved high school graduation or higher and 51.3% a bachelor's degree or higher.

Education
Public schools
The public schools serving the children of Glyndon are:
 Franklin Elementary, Glyndon Elementary (opened 1978)
 Franklin Middle
 Franklin High

Franklin High School is the oldest high school in Baltimore County, founded in Reisterstown in 1820 as the private school Franklin Academy. Local lore contends that Edgar Allan Poe applied to be principal of the Academy in the 1830s but was turned down by the school's trustees. Students may opt to attend a number of magnet schools within the public school system.

Private schools
Some Glyndon children attend nearby Sacred Heart School (K-8), a Catholic parish school. Others attend any number of private schools in the greater Baltimore area, such as
 Gilman School
 St. Paul's School
 St. Paul's School for Girls
 Boys' Latin School of Maryland
 Friends School of Baltimore
 Maryvale Preparatory School
 Loyola Blakefield
 Calvert Hall College High School
 Garrison Forest School
 Bryn Mawr School
 McDonogh School

Higher education
There are a number of institutions of higher learning within a 25-mile radius of Glyndon, offering various levels and intensity of education:
 Stevenson University
 University of Maryland, Baltimore County
 McDaniel College
 Towson University
 Goucher College
 Loyola University Maryland
 Notre Dame of Maryland University
 Johns Hopkins University
 Maryland Institute College of Art
 University of Baltimore
 Coppin State University
 Community College of Baltimore County
 Carroll Community College

Community organizations
Glyndon Community Association (GCA)
The exact date of the first community association meeting in Glyndon is not known, but by early 1945 several community leaders and residents decided to formalize the activities of their group. On February 28, 1945, the group was incorporated under the name of The Glyndon Corporation. According to the original corporate charter, the founding fathers of GCA were Thomas Kooken, Donald P. Bellows, Eugene H. Ryer, as the incorporators; Mr. Bellows, along with John O. Cockey, Rosemund E. Smith, and Ira L. Wales as the first members of the board of directors. Bellows was also the first resident agent.

The name of the community association was changed to the Glyndon Community Association in 1956. The Board of Directors approved the name change on April 23, 1956, and the membership approved the name change at the May 3 membership meeting. The formal change of name was registered with the charter division of the State of Maryland on July 27, 1956.

As stated in its bylaws, the purpose of the GCA is to promote and maintain a strong community spirit in Glyndon, to bring about improved conditions in all things that affect the community in general, and to promote other non-profit purposes.

Membership is open to all individuals 18 years or older who own or occupy residential real property in Glyndon. GCA also has an emeritus membership which is limited to past members of GCA who no longer qualify as a regular member and whose request for Esuch status has been approved by GCA. Membership dues are minimal and a family discount is available.

For the purposes of GCA, Glyndon is the area within a line that generally runs from Emory Grove, including Seven Farms at Worthington Valley, east to Butler Road, across Worthington Avenue, then south to the south side of St. Paul Avenue, out to Central Avenue, north along Central to 350 Central and then west to the railroad tracks and then north across Butler Road back to Emory Grove.

GCA holds its annual meeting, at which its officers and directors are elected, in February. GCA also holds quarterly membership meetings. The board is composed of a president, a first and second vice president, a secretary, a treasurer, six directors elected at large and the immediate past president of GCA. The term of office is one year for officers and two years for directors to ensure both participation from the entire neighborhood and the preservation of institutional memory.

GCA sponsors several events during the course of the year, all currently without charge to the public, even those outside of Glyndon proper. For many years there has been an Easter Egg Hunt. Currently, this is held the Saturday before Easter in Glyndon Station Park, preceded the night before by an egg-stuffing event held at a neighborhood home and attended exclusively by parents.

A long-standing tradition of GCA has been a parade on Independence Day. The parade commences at 10:00 am at the intersection of Albright and Central avenues and proceeds north to Chatsworth, turns left to Railroad Avenue, and then again to the starting point and the historic O’Meara lawn. There, the federal flag is affixed to the end of an extended fire-truck ladder, a prayer is said, and all join in the singing of the national anthem, followed by hot dogs, lemonade and cookies. The parade is in essence a bike parade with children and adults marching the route. The Glyndon Volunteer Fire Department leads the event with one of its trucks, accompanied on occasion by a historic vehicle or lawn tractor.

In autumn, there is a Halloween Party at the firehouse and, at Christmas, GCA lights a local tree and sings carols at its Christmas Tree Lighting and Festival of Carols Without Lessons.

Historic Glyndon, Inc.(HGI)
Historic Glyndon, Inc. was founded in 1972. It began as a committee under the aegis of the Glyndon Community Association and became a separate organization after the town's centennial in 1971. This organization is responsible for having had Glyndon declared a historic district at three levels: national, state and county.

HGI's mission is "to preserve and protect Glyndon's cultural, social, economic and architectural history, as well as to conduct educational and beautification projects which enrich Glyndon's historical heritage."

The organization consists of officers (president, 1st vice-president, 2nd vice-president, treasurer and secretary), nine additional board members, a number of committees and a general membership. Membership is open to anyone with an interest in Glyndon and its mission. The committees include Membership, Architectural Design & Review, Historic House Plaques' Welcome and Holiday Open House

Regular events of HGI include the annual spring meeting of the general membership, a spring clean-up around the train station and post office, a biennial fall Celebrate Glyndon! display, and the Holiday Open House in December. Other endeavors have included the publication of a history book about the village (Glyndon: The Story of a Victorian Village, 1990), a 125th anniversary weekend celebration in 1996, historic town markers, historic street signs, historic house plaques and a house and garden tour.

Famous/renowned residents
Dr. Charles A. Leas
Dr. Charles A. Leas, Glyndon's founder, was Baltimore City's first public health officer. During the Crimean War, he went to Russia at the request of the Russian Minister to serve on the army's medical staff. For this service, he was knighted by Czar Alexander II with the Imperial Order of St. Stanislaus. After the war, President Buchanan appointed him U.S. Consul to Russia. In subsequent years, he also served as American Consul to Sweden, Madeira and British Honduras. Leas eventually returned to Baltimore and shortly thereafter retired and moved to the country. A Baltimore Sun article from February 13, 1952, states, "He soon found that running a farm was not his métier, so he decided to found a little town, where he could live amongst congenial people of his own tastes and inclinations."

The entrance to the Leas homestead, the oldest home in Glyndon, is located at the corner of Albright and Railroad avenues. The main part of the dwelling, more than 200 years old, was originally a farmhouse when bought by Leas and his second wife, Elizabeth Frush, who was known as Lizzie. Leas had three daughters, two with his first wife Eliza Moore Leas, who died in 1850, and one with Lizzie.

T. Rowe Price
Thomas Rowe Price Jr., founder of the investment firm T. Rowe Price, was born in Glyndon in 1898 and spent his childhood there in the home that his father built at 4801 Butler Road. His father was T. Rowe Price Sr., a country doctor who raised three children in Glyndon with his wife Ella (née Black). The young Price graduated from nearby Franklin High School in 1914 and went on to receive a bachelor's degree in chemistry in 1919 from Swarthmore College. After working for a short time as a chemist for the DuPont Company, Price switched to selling stocks and bonds and eventually launched his own investment counseling firm in 1937. He is primarily known as a pioneer of the growth stock approach as well as helping to build the mutual-fund industry. Price died in Baltimore, Maryland, in 1983.

Places and points of interest
 Emory Grove
 Glyndon Park
 Glyndon Station Park
 Train station/post office
 Glyndon School/Woman's Club of Glyndon
 Glyndon Square Shopping Center
 Glyndon Village Shopping Center
 Glyndon Bank building

References

External links
 Historic Glyndon, Inc.
 Woman's Club of Glyndon
 Glyndon Volunteer Fire Department
 Emory Grove, Maryland
 Baltimore County Office of Planning, Historic Preservation
 Reisterstown, Owings Mills, Glyndon Chamber of Commerce
 Glyndon United Methodist Church
 Sacred Heart Parish of Glyndon

Unincorporated communities in Maryland
Unincorporated communities in Baltimore County, Maryland
1871 establishments in Maryland